Glena quinquelinearia, the five-lined gray, is a species of geometrid moth in the family Geometridae. It was described by Alpheus Spring Packard in 1874 and is found in North America.

References

 Ferris C. (2010). "A revision of the genus Antepione Packard with description of the new genus Pionenta Ferris (Lepidoptera, Geometridae, Ennominae)". ZooKeys. 71: 49-70.
 Hodges, R.W.; et al., eds. (1983). Check List of the Lepidoptera of America North of Mexico: Including Greenland. 284.
 Rindge, Frederick H. (1965). "A Revision of the Nearctic Species of the Genus Glena (Lepidoptera, Geometridae)". Bulletin of the American Museum of Natural History. 129 art. 3, 265-306.
 Scoble, Malcolm J., ed. (1999). Geometrid Moths of the World: A Catalogue (Lepidoptera, Geometridae). 1016.

Further reading

 Arnett, Ross H. (2000). American Insects: A Handbook of the Insects of America North of Mexico. CRC Press.

Boarmiini
Moths described in 1874